Orodara is a department or commune of Kénédougou Province in south-western Burkina Faso. Its capital is the town of Orodara.

Towns and villages

References

Departments of Burkina Faso
Kénédougou Province